Capsodes is a genus of plant bugs belonging to the family Miridae, subfamily Mirinae.

Species

 Capsodes bicolor (Fieber, 1864)
 Capsodes flavomarginatus (Donovan, 1798)
 Capsodes gothicus (Linnaeus, 1758)
 Capsodes mat (Rossi, 1790)
 Capsodes robustus Wagner, 1951
 Capsodes sulcatus (Fieber, 1861)
 Capsodes vittiventris (Puton, 1883)

References

External links 
 BioLib
 Fauna Europaea

Miridae genera
Articles containing video clips
Mirini